The 2016 Polynesian Championships in Athletics was the fifth Polynesian Championships. It was held from the 7 - 9 April in Papeete, Tahiti at the Pater Stadium.

Participation 

 (6)

Medal summary

Men

Men Under 18

Women

Women Under 18

Mixed

Medal table

References 

Polynesian Championships in Athletics
Athletics competitions in French Polynesia
Polynesian Championships in Athletics
April 2016 sports events in Oceania
2016 in French Polynesian sport